William Beckett-Denison (10 September 1826 – 23 November 1890) was an English banker and  Conservative Party politician who sat in the House of Commons in two periods between 1876 and 1890. He died when he fell under a train.

Early life
Born William Beckett on 10 September 1826, he was the third and second surviving son of Sir Edmund Beckett, 4th Baronet, of Grimthorpe, Yorkshire, and his wife Maria Beverley, daughter of William Beverley of Beverley.

He was educated at the Rugby School and Trinity College, Cambridge.

Career
In 1847, at twenty-one, he joined his father's banking firm of Beckett & Co. He later made partner and, in 1874, was made head of the firm at Leeds, Doncaster and Retford.  Upon the retirement of Leslie Melville, he became head of the English County Bankers' Association as well as the East Riding Bank at Beverley and Malton. He was a captain in the Yorkshire Hussar Yeomanry Cavalry and a J.P. and Deputy Lieutenant  for the West Riding of Yorkshire.

In 1865, Beckett became the first chairman of the publishing company Yorkshire Post Newspapers. Successive chairmen were members of the Beckett family until the retirement of Rupert Beckett in 1950.

In 1876 Beckett was elected a Conservative Member of Parliament for East Retford but lost the seat in 1880.  At the 1885 general election he was elected MP for Bassetlaw. He held the seat until his death in 1890.

Personal life
Beckett married the Hon. Helen Duncombe, third daughter of William Duncombe, 2nd Baron Feversham and Lady Louisa Stewart (daughter of George Stewart, 8th Earl of Galloway), in 1855. They lived at Meanwood Park in Leeds and at Nun Appleton, Yorkshire, and were the parents of at least seven children, including:

 Ernest William Beckett (1856–1917), who became the 2nd Baron Grimthorpe.
 Helen Louisa Beckett-Denison (1858–1935).
 Adeline Gertrude Beckett-Denison (1859–1902), who married Sir Frederick Milner, 7th Baronet.
 Violet Katharine Beckett-Denison (1860–1883), who married Reginald Walkeline Chandos-Pole, grandson of Leicester Stanhope, 5th Earl of Harrington.
 Maud Augusta Beckett-Denison (1864–1927), who married Lord Henry Nevill (later 3rd Marquess of Abergavenny).
 William Gervase Beckett (1866–1937), who became Sir Gervase Beckett, 1st Baronet of Kirkdale Manor.
 Hon. Rupert Evelyn Beckett (1870–1955), who married Muriel Helen Florence Paget, granddaughter of Henry Paget, 2nd Marquess of Anglesey.

Beckett died at the age of 64 when he fell under a train at Wimborne. He had arrived at  Wimborne railway station to change trains for Bournemouth, and while waiting went for a walk. He was walking beside the track on the way back to the station when a strong wind blew his hat off and he fell almost immediately under the train. His body was cut to pieces and carried some 56 feet.

Following his death, a Mrs Gertrude Beatrice Brinkworth alleged she was his mistress and mother of his adopted children and sued his executors. Some money was paid but the case came before court and the jury declared Mrs Brinkworth's case to be a 'swindle' and rejected her claims even before the evidence in the case had been completed.

References

External links
 

1826 births
1890 deaths
Deputy Lieutenants of the West Riding of Yorkshire
Railway accident deaths in England
Conservative Party (UK) MPs for English constituencies
UK MPs 1874–1880
UK MPs 1885–1886
UK MPs 1886–1892
English bankers
Younger sons of baronets
Yorkshire Hussars officers
19th-century English businesspeople
Yorkshire Post Newspapers
William